Sung-Hi Lee (Korean:이승희) is a South Korean model and actress based in North America. She has been featured in Playboy magazine as well as in many other magazines and some commercial advertising.

Early life and education
Born in Gija-chon, Eunpyeong District of Seoul, Lee moved to the United States in 1978. She attended Ohio State University on a scholarship for three years.

Career
Lee has worked as an actress, appearing in films such as A Night on the Water (1998), Error in Judgment (1998), Chain of Command (2000), Nurse Betty (2000), This Girl's Life (2003), National Lampoon's Christmas Vacation 2: Cousin Eddie's Island Adventure (2003), and as Ferrari in The Girl Next Door (2004). She has also appeared on television, in the Queen of Swords episode "The Dragon" (2001) and landing roles such as DC Comics villain Lady Shiva in 2002's Birds of Prey and the waitress Sophie on the soap opera Days of Our Lives. She also starred on The King of Queens in the 2002 episode "Holy Mackerel". In 2007 she played Tricia Tanaka in the Lost episode "Tricia Tanaka Is Dead" and also appeared in the series premiere of the FOX sitcom Back to You. In 2009, Lee appeared in the action film The Art of War III: Retribution (2009) as Sun Yi, and as Crystal in the comedy Tripping Forward (2009).

Lee has also had a career in modeling, ranging from high-profile adult magazines such as Playboy (in which she was the first Asian model to feature on the cover) to advertisements for Acer Computers, Chrysler, Brut, Miller Beer, Mountain Dew, Maxwell House and Sunkist Juice.

Filmography

Film

Television

References

External links
 
 

1970 births
Living people
American film actresses
American soap opera actresses
American television actresses
American actresses of Korean descent
American models of Korean descent
Ohio State University alumni
Miss Hawaiian Tropic delegates
South Korean emigrants to the United States
South Korean film actresses
South Korean television actresses
South Korean female models
People from Seoul
21st-century American women